The Men's stayer was held on 21 October 2017. 7 riders were motor-paced by their pilots over a distance of 50 km (200 laps)

Results

References

Men's stayer
European Track Championships – Men's stayer